Thomas Currie may refer to:
Tom Currie (footballer) (born 1970), Scottish former footballer
Tom W. Currie, American pastor, college president, and college football coach
Thomas Currie, one of the first settlers of Tristan da Cunha
Thomas Currie, a fictional character in The Books of Magic

See also
Thomas Curry (disambiguation)